Kathleen Maguire (September 27, 1925 – August 9, 1989) was an American actress who won an Obie Award in 1958 for her performance in the stage play, The Time of the Cuckoo.

Early years 
Born in New York City, Maguire was an acting student of Lee Strasberg and Sanford Meisner.

Career 
Maguire was also known for two roles in two short-lived soap operas on television, first as wealthy widow, Kate Austen on A Flame in the Wind; and as extremely conservative doctor's wife, Adrian Sims on the series A World Apart. She later replaced Doris Belack in the role of Anna Wolek Craig in the long-running serial One Life to Live.  Among her film credits are the 1957 drama Edge of the City, Flipper (1963), The Borgia Stick (1967), The Concorde ... Airport '79 (1979), Willie & Phil (1980), and the TV movie Bill (1981).

Death
Maguire died from cancer of the esophagus on August 9, 1989, at Calvary Hospital, The Bronx, New York. She was 63 years old and lived in Manhattan.

Filmography

Film

Television

References

External links
 
 
 New York Times obituary

1925 births
1989 deaths
Actresses from New York City
American film actresses
American stage actresses
American television actresses
Deaths from cancer in New York (state)
Deaths from esophageal cancer
Obie Award recipients
20th-century American actresses